Allium atrorubens is a species of wild onion known by the common name  dark red onion. This plant is native to the southwestern United States where it grows in the sandy soils of the Mojave Desert, the Great Basin and higher-elevation deserts in Nevada, eastern California (San Bernardino, Kern, Mono, Inyo and Lassen Counties) southwestern Utah (Kane, Millard and Beaver Counties), northwestern Arizona (Mohave and Coconino Counties).

The stem is short and is surrounded by few coiled tubular leaves. Atop the stem is an inflorescence of up to 50 flowers. Each flower has six shiny, iridescent, sharply triangular tepals with dark midveins. The tepals are usually magenta to maroon but are lighter pink or white occasionally.

References

External links
Jepson Manual Treatment
USDA Plants Profile

atrorubens
Flora of the California desert regions
Flora of the Great Basin
Onions
Flora of Arizona
Flora of California
Flora of Nevada
Flora of Utah
Taxa named by Sereno Watson
Flora without expected TNC conservation status